Gabrielle Aboudi Onguéné (born 25 February 1989) is a Cameroonian footballer who plays for CSKA Moscow in the Russian Championship and the Cameroon national team. She previously played for Rossiyanka.

Early life
Born in Douala, Aboudi Onguéné began playing football with boys in her neighborhood as a child. She was spotted and recruited to play for girls' club, Ngondi Nkam Yabassi. While playing in a tournament for the club, she was spotted by Canon Yaoundé and began playing for the team in 2005.

Playing career

Club

Louves Minproff de Yaoundé, 2009–12 
Aboudi Onguéné played for Louves Minproff in the top-division Cameroonian league and helped the team win the national championship in 2009, 2010, and 2011.

Rossiyanka, 2015–16 
Aboudi Onguéné signed with Rossiyanka in Russia's top division league for the 2015 season. Her six goals in ten appearances ranked third in the league and helped the team finish in second place. During the 2016 season, she scored 6 goals in 13 games helping the team finish first in the league with a  record.

CSKA Moskva, 2017– 
Aboudi Onguéné signed with CSKA Moscow ahead of the 2017 season. Her 9 goals in 14 appearances tied for second highest in the league. The team finished in fourth place with a  record. During the 2018 season, she scored 3 goals in 13 appearances. Aboudi Onguéné scored her first goal of the 2019 season against Zvezda Perm on May 9 helping the team win 3–1.

International
Aboudi Onguéné has represented Cameroon on the Cameroonian national team since 2008 after being scouted at the age of 15. In 2011, she helped the team win gold at the All-Africa Games in Mozambique. During the semi-final against South Africa, she scored the game-winning goal.

Aboudi Onguéné competed at the 2012 London Olympics and scored the team's lone goal in the tournament. At the 2015 FIFA Women's World Cup in Canada, she scored an equalizer in the team's 2–1 win over Switzerland and was named Player of the Match. She was voted best player at the 2016 Africa Women Cup of Nations.

, Aboudi Onguéné has been nominated for African Women's Footballer of the Year four consecutive times.

At the 2019 FIFA Women's World Cup in France, Aboudi Onguéné scored an equalizer against the Netherlands during the team's second group stage match.

International goals

Honours

Individual
 IFFHS CAF Woman Team of the Decade 2011–2020

References

External links

 
 Player profile at Olympic Games
 

1989 births
Living people
Cameroonian women's footballers
Women's association football forwards
ZFK CSKA Moscow players
WFC Rossiyanka players
Cameroon women's international footballers
Olympic footballers of Cameroon
Footballers at the 2012 Summer Olympics
2015 FIFA Women's World Cup players
2019 FIFA Women's World Cup players
Cameroonian expatriate women's footballers
Cameroonian expatriate sportspeople in Russia
Expatriate women's footballers in Russia
20th-century Cameroonian women
21st-century Cameroonian women